Battle of Auvere was a battle in Estonia, starting on July 20, 1944 and ending on July 25. It was a part of the World War II  campaign in Narva.

The Soviet 8th Army started attacking the Auvere Station on July 20 with artillery fire. The defenders had some losses. The Estonians and Germans (of the 11th (East Prussian) Infantry Division) had built trenches and dug themselves into foxholes. In the morning of July 24, the Soviet assault commenced with 30–50 batteries firing 17,000 shells and grenades (2,000 tons), inflicting significant casualties to the Estonian 45th Regiment in Auvere and the 44th Infantry Regiment in the borough of Sirgala.

After two hours of preparatory artillery fire, the two regiments were attacked from the air. Three German and eight Soviet bombers were shot down in air combat. Under artillery cover, the Soviet 122nd Rifle Corps and a tank brigade pierced to the German positions, while the 117th Rifle Corps encircled the Estonian regiment, which reformed themselves in circular defence.

Relieved by Paul Albert Kausch's Kampfgruppe (the "Nordland" Tank Battalion with additional units) and three rocket artillery launchers, the Estonians went on for a counterattack. The 44th Regiment was saved by the swift movement of artillery behind them clearing their previous positions of Soviet troops. The 117th Rifle Corps reached the headquarters of the Estonian I Battalion, who resisted by heavy machine-gun fire in circular defence. The support by the anti-tank weapons of the 14th Company and Kausch's Kampfgruppe helped to seize the main frontline back to the control of the "Narwa".

The attempts by the 117th and the 122nd Rifle Corps to break through were repelled in a similar way, causing them to lose 3,000 men, 17 planes and 29 tanks, compared to the loss of 800 troops of army detachment "Narwa". On the next day, the Soviet 8th Army tried to capture the German positions again, but they were repelled by machine guns.

Forces
Germany

 III SS Corps
 11th East Prussian Infantry Division
 20th Estonian SS Division
 45th Estonian Regiment
 First Battalion, 47th Estonian Regiment
 20th Estonian Fusilier Battalion (former Battalion Narwa) 

Soviet Union
 8th Army
 122nd Rifle Corps
 117th Rifle Corps

References

Battles involving Estonia
Conflicts in 1944
Battle of Narva (1944)
1944 in Estonia
Generalbezirk Estland
Estonian Soviet Socialist Republic
Ida-Viru County
July 1944 events